In mathematics, a theorem that covers a variety of cases is sometimes called  a master theorem.

Some theorems called master theorems in their fields include:

 Master theorem (analysis of algorithms), analyzing the asymptotic behavior of divide-and-conquer algorithms
 Ramanujan's master theorem, providing an analytic expression for the Mellin transform of an analytic function
 MacMahon master theorem (MMT), in enumerative combinatorics and linear algebra
 Glasser's master theorem in integral calculus